Nardeo Snatak (born September 1917, date of death unknown) was an Indian politician in the state of Uttar Pradesh who was a member of 1st Lok Sabha, representing the Aligarh constituency. He was re-elected to the 2nd Lok Sabha. Snatak was elected to 3rd and 4th Lok Sabha from the constituency of Hathras.

Snatak was born at Bela village, Etawah district in September 1917. He is deceased.

References

1917 births
Year of death missing
People from Etawah district
India MPs 1952–1957
India MPs 1957–1962
India MPs 1962–1967
India MPs 1967–1970
Lok Sabha members from Uttar Pradesh
People from Aligarh district
People from Hathras district
Indian National Congress politicians from Uttar Pradesh